Necdin is a protein that in humans is encoded by the NDN gene.

Function 

This intronless gene is located in the Prader-Willi syndrome (PWS) deletion region. It is an imprinted gene and is expressed exclusively from the paternal allele. Studies in mice suggest that the protein encoded by this gene may suppress growth in postmitotic neurons.

Necdin is used to stimulate growth regulation and DNA-dependent transcription regulation.

Interactions 

NDN (gene) has been shown to interact with:

 E2F1, 
 HNRNPU,
 IL1A, 
 Low affinity nerve growth factor receptor, 
 NUCB2,  and
 P53

References

Further reading 

 
 
 
 
 
 
 
 
 
 
 
 
 
 
 
 
 

Human proteins